Fallout 4 is a 2015 action role-playing game developed by Bethesda Game Studios and published by Bethesda Softworks. It is the fourth main game in the Fallout series and was released worldwide on November 10, 2015, for PlayStation 4, Windows, and Xbox One. The game is set within an open world post-apocalyptic environment that encompasses the city of Boston and the surrounding Massachusetts region known as "The Commonwealth". It makes use of a number of local landmarks, including Bunker Hill, Fort Independence, and Old North Bridge near Concord, as the bridge out of Sanctuary Hills.

The main story takes place in the year 2287, ten years after the events of Fallout 3 and 210 years after "The Great War", which caused catastrophic nuclear devastation across the United States. The player assumes control of a character referred to as the "Sole Survivor", who emerges from a long-term cryogenic stasis in Vault 111, an underground nuclear fallout shelter. After witnessing the murder of their spouse and kidnapping of their son, the Sole Survivor ventures out into the Commonwealth to search for their missing child. The player explores the game's dilapidated world, completes various quests, helps out factions, and acquires experience points to level up and increase the abilities of their character. New features to the series include the ability to develop and manage settlements and an extensive crafting system where materials scavenged from the environment can be used to craft drugs and explosives, upgrade weapons and armor, and construct, furnish and improve settlements. Fallout 4 also marks the first game in the series to feature full voice acting for the protagonist.

Fallout 4 received positive reviews from critics, with many praising the world depth, player freedom, overall amount of content, crafting, story, characters, and soundtrack. Criticism was mainly directed at the game's simplified rpg elements compared to its predecessors and technical issues.  The game was a commercial and critical success, generating  within the first 24 hours of its launch, and received numerous accolades from various gaming publications and award events, including the respective awards for Game of the Year and Best Game at the Academy of Interactive Arts & Sciences and British Academy Games Awards. Bethesda has released six downloadable content add-ons, including the expansions Far Harbor and Nuka-World.

Gameplay 
Fallout 4 is an action role-playing game set in an open world environment. Gameplay is similar to that of Fallout 3 and Fallout: New Vegas, the two previous primary iterations in the series. But unlike the previous two titles, the gun-gameplay was handled by id Software. Returning features include a camera that can switch between a first-person and third-person perspective. Fallout 4 introduces features including a layered armor system, base-building, a dialogue system featuring 111,000 lines of dialogue, and a crafting system which implements every lootable object in the game. Enemies such as Mole Rats, Raiders, Super Mutants, Deathclaws, and Feral Ghouls return along with the companion Dogmeat.

The player has the ability to freely roam in the game's world and leave a conversation at any time. If the player has discovered a certain location they may fast travel to it. Weapons can be customized too; the game includes over 50 guns, which can be crafted with a variety of modifications, such as barrel types and laser focus, with over 700 modifications available. Power Armor has been redesigned to be more like a vehicle than an equipable suit of armor, requiring fusion cores and being essentially dead weight without it and can be modified, allowing the player to add items such as a jetpack or selecting separate types of armor for each part of the suit.

A new feature to the series is the ability to craft and deconstruct settlements and buildings. The player can select and break down many in-game objects and structures, and use the resultant raw materials to freely build their own structures. In addition, the towns can be powered with working electricity, using a power line system. Merchants and non-player characters can inhabit the player's settlements, for which the player must provide sustenance by growing food in makeshift patches and building water pumps. The player can build various defenses around their settlements, such as turrets and traps and bombs, to defend against random attacks.

The Pip-Boy, a personal computing device strapped to the player character's wrist, allows the player to access a menu with statistics, maps, data, and items the player has acquired. The player can find game cartridges, called Holotapes, which can be played on the Pip-Boy or a terminal. A new feature for the Pip-Boy interface is a downloadable application for iOS, Android, and Windows smartphones and tablets. This optional app allows players to access the Pip-Boy interface on a separate screen, and play the collected game cartridges when not playing the main game. Another returning gameplay feature is the Vault-Tec Assisted Targeting System (V.A.T.S.). While using V.A.T.S., real-time combat is slowed down (instead of stopped entirely as in previous entries), and action is played out from varying camera angles in a computer graphics version of "bullet time". Various actions cost points, limiting the actions of each combatant during a period of time, and the player can target specific body parts for attacks to inflict specific injuries; headshots can be used for quick kills or to blind, legs can be targeted to slow enemy movement, and opponents can be disarmed by shooting at their weapons. Unlike previous games, in which the player had a random chance to inflict a critical hit, they are now performed manually through V.A.T.S.

At the beginning of the game, players are given points to spend on a character progression system called S.P.E.C.I.A.L. The system represents seven statistics, namely strength, perception, endurance, charisma, intelligence, agility, and luck. When the player earns enough experience points to gain a new level, they unlock an ability. When the player allocates more points to a statistic, more abilities can be unlocked. These perks can be upgraded to improve the protagonist's efficiency and to further unlock abilities. There are about 275 perks available for the player to unlock. There is no level cap and the game does not end once the main story is complete.

The player may travel with only one companion at a time, although other characters also accompany the player in certain quests. For the first time in the series, these companions can interact with the environment on the player character's behalf. For example, if the player character does not have required skills to hack a terminal or pick a lock, they can order the companion to do it for them. Any companion present besides Dogmeat will react to certain player actions in one of four ways (love, like, dislike, or hate), which either raises or lowers their "affinity". Raising a companion's affinity to 1,000 points will result in them "idolizing" the player and granting a specific perk. Partnership with companions is also possible at higher affinities. The companion will leave if affinity drops low enough, and some actions can turn them hostile on sight.

Plot

Setting 
Fallout 4 takes place in the year 2287, ten years after the events of Fallout 3 and 210 years after the Great War, a war between the United States and China over natural resources that ended in a nuclear holocaust in 2077. The setting is a post-apocalyptic retro-future, covering a region that includes Boston and other parts of New England known as "The Commonwealth". Unlike the previous titles, Fallout 4s story begins on the day the bombs dropped: October 23, 2077.

The game takes place in an alternate version of history that contains 1940s and 1950s aesthetics such as diners and a drive-in theater and design and technology advance in the directions imagined at that time. The resulting universe is thus a retro-futuristic one, where the technology has evolved enough to produce laser weapons, manipulate genes and create nearly-autonomous artificial intelligence, but all within the confines of 1950s' technology such as the widespread use of atomic power and vacuum tubes, as well as having the integrated circuitry of the digital age. The architecture, advertisements and general living styles are also depicted to be largely unchanged since the 1950s, while including contemporary products, such as a robotic rocking horse for children in one advertisement, or posters for the underground Vaults that play a central role in the storyline of the game.

There are four main factions that the player can choose to support throughout the story; the Institute, a secretive organization that specializes in the creation of artificial humanoids called "synths", the Brotherhood of Steel, an anti-synth faction hoping to preserve technology in the Commonwealth; the Minutemen, a faction that aims to drive out raiders and other threats out of the Commonwealth; and the Railroad, a secretive organization dedicated to rescuing synths from the Institute.

Characters 
The player's character (voiced by either Brian T. Delaney or Courtenay Taylor) takes shelter in Vault 111, emerging exactly 210 years later on October 23, 2287, and assuming the name of the "Sole Survivor". There are thirteen possible companions in the story. Dogmeat, a loyal German Shepherd, is the only mandatory companion, but six others must at least be encountered; Codsworth (Stephen Russell), the Sole Survivor's robot butler; Deacon (Ryan Alosio), a Railroad agent; John Hancock (Danny Shorago), the mayor of Goodneighbor; Nick Valentine (Stephen Russell), a synth detective; Piper Wright (Courtney Ford), an intrepid reporter; and Preston Garvey (Jon Gentry), the reluctant leader of the Minutemen. The other six possible companions are Cait (Katy Townsend), an Irish-accented cage fighter; Curie (Sophie Simone Cortina), a robot scientist turned Synth; Danse (Peter Jessop), a Brotherhood of Steel Paladin; MacCready (Matthew Mercer), a mercenary; Strong (Sean Schemmel), a human-sympathetic Super Mutant; and X6-88 (David Paluck), an Institute Courser.

Seven of the companions become romance options once they idolize the Sole Survivor, regardless of the gender of the player character: Cait, Curie, Danse, Hancock, MacCready, Piper, and Preston.

Story 
The story begins in 2077 in Sanctuary Hills, located near Concord, Massachusetts. The player character is at home with their spouse (Nate or Nora depending on the player character's gender), their son Shaun, and Codsworth, a robotic butler. A Vault-Tec representative admits the family into Vault 111, the local fallout shelter. Moments later, a news bulletin warns of an incoming nuclear attack as nukes have already hit New York City and Philadelphia, triggering the civil defense sirens and general panic. As the detonation occurs, the family evacuates to the Vault, where they are tricked into entering cryogenic tubes and frozen alive. After an unknown number of years, they are reawakened by two strangers, who murder the player's spouse and kidnap Shaun. The player is put back into cryogenic sleep and awakens again when the life support system malfunctions. The player, nicknamed the "Sole Survivor" of Vault 111, vows to avenge their spouse's death and find Shaun.

The Sole Survivor heads home to find Sanctuary Hills in ruins. They reunite with Codsworth, revealing that 210 years have passed since the war. Codsworth suggests that the Survivor go to Concord for help. The Survivor finds and befriends Dogmeat, and assists the Minutemen faction in evacuating to Sanctuary Hills. The Sole Survivor travels to Diamond City, a fortified settlement based in the ruins of Fenway Park, where they meet Piper. There, they learn about a secretive organization called the Institute that has been terrifying the Commonwealth by kidnapping people and replacing them with "synths", synthetic humans indistinguishable from real humans.

After locating and rescuing Nick Valentine, the Sole Survivor uncovers the identity of their spouse's killer: Conrad Kellogg (Keythe Farley). After learning from Kellogg that Shaun is being held in the Institute, the Sole Survivor kills him and retrieves a cybernetic implant from his brain to access his memories. During this time, the Brotherhood of Steel arrives in the Commonwealth on the Prydwen, an airship. The Sole Survivor learns from Brian Virgil (Matthew Waterson), an ex-Institute scientist, that teleportation is the only way to enter the Institute. After the Survivor retrieves a chip and decodes it with the help of the Railroad, Virgil provides the blueprints for a teleportation device, which the Sole Survivor constructs by allying with the Brotherhood of Steel, Minutemen, or Railroad.

The Sole Survivor successfully enters the Institute and discovers that Shaun is the Institute's director. Shaun, now an old man calling himself Father (Tony Amendola), reveals that he was kidnapped by Kellogg to become a specimen for synth experiments due to his pure pre-war DNA, and that the Sole Survivor remained in stasis for a further sixty years before being reawakened. He invites the Sole Survivor to join the Institute. If accepted, Shaun reveals that he is dying of cancer and wishes for the Survivor to become his successor. After initiating a purge in the Commonwealth, wiping out the Brotherhood of Steel and the Railroad, the Survivor assumes control of the Institute after Shaun's death. Otherwise, the Sole Survivor devises a plan with their faction to fight the Institute. Siding with the Brotherhood or Railroad will force the Sole Survivor to destroy the other faction. The Sole Survivor detonates a nuclear reactor, destroying the Institute. After this feat, if the Survivor sided with the Minutemen, they must lastly wipe out any remaining hostile faction. Otherwise, they will remain neutral.

Development 

The initial plans for Fallout 4 were formed in 2009, when director Todd Howard wanted to explore the world of Fallout before the bombs fell. Thus, a team began production on the game that year, including Istvan Pely, lead artist of Fallout 3, after finishing that game's downloadable content (DLC). Meanwhile, development on The Elder Scrolls V: Skyrim had Bethesda's full attention, and after that game released in 2011, the studio continued to regularly support it until 2013 with updates and DLC. After that content was finished, Fallout 4 entered full production from mid-2013 to mid-2015.

Design 

Unlike the previous two titles—Fallout 3 and Fallout: New Vegas—which used the Gamebryo engine, Fallout 4 uses the Creation Engine, which was used in The Elder Scrolls V: Skyrim. Modified for Fallout 4, the Creation Engine includes a revamped character editor system that allows freeform creation of faces without the use of sliders seen in previous games. Instead, the player can click and drag each feature of the face to accurately customize their character, which can either be a man or woman as the previous Fallout titles have featured. Bethesda announced that the game would run at 1080p resolution and 30 frames per second on PlayStation 4 and Xbox One. Bethesda revealed that mobile devices would be integrated into the game as a form of second screen, acting as a secondary display for the Pip-Boy.

For the first time in the Fallout series, the player's character, the Sole Survivor, is fully voice acted, including all decision-based dialogue options. Brian T. Delaney and Courtenay Taylor are the two player character voice actors.

Todd Howard revealed that mods for the PC versions of the game would be usable on the Xbox One version and that the team hoped to bring them to the PlayStation 4 version eventually. When asked about the failed effort to add a paid mod system to The Elder Scrolls V: Skyrim, Howard stated there were no plans for a similar effort with Fallout 4. The mods created by PC players through The Creation Kit, which contains the official modding tools, were released for Xbox One and PlayStation 4 in May 2016 and November 2016 respectively.

Engine 

Fallout 4 uses Bethesda's Creation Engine, which was created for The Elder Scrolls V: Skyrim. Just after Fallout 3s release, the team devised numerous design objectives to meet for Skyrim—which were updated for Fallout 4s hardware requirements. The updated Creation Engine allows for graphical improvements over Bethesda's previous efforts. For instance, the draw distance renders much farther than in previous Fallout games.

Dynamic lighting allows shadows to be created by any structure or item in the game world. Howard stated in the E3 2015 Press Conference that the updated Creation Engine allows for next-generation god rays and advanced volumetric lighting. The engine features a variety of visual effects not present in previous Bethesda games such as motion blur, temporal anti-aliasing, height fog, dynamic dismemberment, screen space reflections, filmic tone mapping, an updated material system—for wet textures—among numerous others. The engine allows the Bethesda team to add more dynamic lighting to every scene as well as "paint surfaces with realistic materials". Bethesda released an example on how the engine works: "When a rain storm rolls in, our new material system allows the surfaces of the world to get wet, and a new cloth simulation system makes cloth, hair, and vegetation blow in the wind."

The updated Creation Engine allows for a more advanced character creation system, which uses sculpting—forgoing the series of sliders present in previous games. In detail, the new character creation system introduces a new, freeform, slider-free facial editor controlled via dynamic, real-time modeling interface.

With regards to the aforementioned fluid animations, the updated engine also allows a much more open approach to conversations with NPCs—wherein the camera views can change depending on the player's preference from a first-person view to a cinematic third-person view—compared to Fallout 3s rigid and instanced conversation system. The protagonist features dynamic dialogue, which is context sensitive and allows players to back out of a conversation. In Howard's words, "you are free to walk away anytime if you want, or you can even shoot him in the face."

Marketing and release 
On June 2, 2015, Bethesda published a countdown timer scheduled to expire on June 3, 2015, at 14:00 UTC. The game's website went live slightly ahead of schedule, revealing the game along with its box art and platforms. The site was taken down later but was put back up again at the scheduled time. The trailer was released when the countdown timer expired, and the game was confirmed to take place in Boston and its surrounding Massachusetts countryside, as suggested by earlier rumors. More details were given during Bethesda's E3 2015 press conference on June 14, 2015.

Fallout 4 became available for pre-order following the product announcement. In addition to the standard edition of the game, there is a collector's edition which includes a wearable replica of the Pip-Boy. This is able to house a smartphone device, which can run the second screen functionality of the game. As a pre-order bonus for the Windows version of the game, an announcer pack featuring the voice of Mister Handy was released for the multiplayer online battle arena game, Dota 2, developed by Valve. Bethesda announced that Fallout 4 had gone gold on October 23, 2015. The game was released for Windows, PlayStation 4 and Xbox One on November 10, 2015.

Updates 
After Fallout 4s release, Bethesda has released several patches to address some of the issues that were present at the game's launch along with presenting features that improve general gameplay. The first patch—coded as patch 1.2—fine-tuned the game by improving the frame rate. Patch 1.2 fixed a few bugs and errors present at the launch of the game but interfered with unofficial mod support. Patch 1.3 improved the game's graphics on all platforms, along with presenting the game with new features such as an added status menu for settlers in settlements. With regard to the graphical updates introduced in this patch, the PC platform was given a new weapon debris effect and a new ambient occlusion setting. The patch fixed several bugs and glitches present in the game. Patch 1.4 was designed to ready the game for the upcoming Creation Kit and downloadable content. Patch 1.4 brought a variety of additions to the settlement building mechanic of the game by adding a symbol to new content placed in by the modding community along with adding a variety of items, such as Raider and Super Mutant decors. The patch also brought general improvements to the game's stability. The 1.5 patch added a revamped survival mode along with support for the downloadable and included bug fixes. Similar to the previous Bethesda games, Fallout 4s fan community-created unofficial patches to address issues and bugs unaddressed by the official patches.

During E3 2016, a virtual reality mode for the game was announced, to be released in 2017. Fallout 4 VR was released as a stand-alone game on December 4, 2017, for PC on the HTC Vive platform.

Downloadable content 

On February 16, 2016, Bethesda announced details, prices, and release dates for the first three add-ons for Fallout 4. The first add-on, Automatron, which allows the player to build their custom robot companion by using robot parts while adding additional quests, was released to the European and North American markets on March 22, 2016. This was followed by Wasteland Workshop on April 12, 2016, which introduces new build options for settlements and the ability for the player to put captured creatures or humans in a cage, and adds new decorations like neon lights and lettering. The third add-on, titled Far Harbor, is a story expansion set in the post-war city of Far Harbor, Maine, and was released on May 19, 2016. On June 12, 2016, at E3 2016, Bethesda revealed three new add-on packages for the game; the first two, Contraptions Workshop, released on June 21, 2016, and Vault-Tec Workshop, released on July 26, 2016, are structured similarly to the Wasteland Workshop add-on, offering the player more build options and decorations; the Vault-Tec Workshop also adds a brief narrative. Fallout 4s third add-on, Nuka-World, which was released on August 30, 2016, adds an amusement park-based area for the player to explore, in which the player can either side with or put an end to various raider groups residing in the park. If the player decides to do the former, they can help one of the raider groups take control of various settlements in the Commonwealth from the base game.

Creation Club 

At E3 2017, Bethesda announced that Fallout 4 would support Creation Club, an in-game support system to purchase and download custom content. Creation Club went live in August 2017.

Reception 

Fallout 4 received "generally favorable" reviews on all three platforms according to review aggregator Metacritic.

GameSpot's Peter Brown awarded it a score of 9 out of 10, saying "Fallout 4 is an argument for substance over style, and an excellent addition to the revered open-world series." Brown praised the "thought-provoking" narrative, "intuitive" creation tools, the large amount of content, the overall combat, and the overall freedom the player is given. Game Informers Andrew Reiner scored the game a 9 out of 10 and said: "Bethesda has created another game you can lose your life in. New experiences just keep coming, and you always have another perk to unlock." Reiner praised the "vastly improved" combat, the "denser" world, and the "brilliant" score, but had mixed feelings about the visuals. Dan Stapleton of IGN scored the game a 9.5 out of 10 and wrote: "The world, exploration, crafting, atmosphere, and story of Fallout 4 are all key parts of this hugely successful sandbox role-playing game. (It is) an adventure I'll definitely replay and revisit. Even the technical shakiness that crops up here and there can't even begin to slow down its momentum."

Phil Savage of PC Gamer mentioned that Fallout 4 is "a loving production. It's filled with care and attention to detail" and that it was "a pleasure to pick through the world". He concluded his review stating "many of Fallout 4s problems, like every Bethesda RPG before it, are a consequence of what makes them unforgettable". Polygon awarded it a score of 9.5 out of 10, saying "Fallout 4 brings great gameplay to match its world and ambiance". Destructoid gave the game a 7.5 out of 10, writing "a lot of the franchise's signature problems have carried over directly into Fallout 4".

Sales 
Fallout 4 sold 1.2 million copies on Steam in its first 24 hours of release. The game also sold more digital than physical copies on day one of launch. With almost 470,000 concurrent Steam players on launch day, Fallout 4 broke Grand Theft Auto Vs record for having the most concurrent online players in a Steam game not developed by Valve. Bethesda shipped 12 million units to retailers within the first 24 hours, grossing .

In early 2017, Pete Hines announced that Fallout 4 had sold more copies over the same time period than Skyrim, though he did not provide an official number.

Awards 
Fallout 4 received numerous awards and nominations from gaming publications such as GameSpot, GamesRadar, EGM, Game Revolution, IGN, and many more. The game received a "Game of the Year" award from the 19th ceremony of the Academy of Interactive Arts & Sciences—also known as the D.I.C.E. Awards—among numerous nominations for the award from The Game Awards, The Daily Telegraph, PC Gamer, IGN and more. It was also placed on various lists of the best games of 2015 in which GameSpot put it at sixth, GamesRadar at fourth, among others top lists. The game also received awards and nominations for Role-playing game of the year with it winning the award from Game Critics and D.I.C.E. with nominations from various other gaming publications.

Legal issues
A class-action lawsuit was filed against Bethesda Softworks and ZeniMax Media in 2019 over its DLC packages. The suit asserted that the Season Pass was sold as offering "all of the Fallout 4 DLC we ever do" for a single price, but later with the introduction of the Creation Club in 2017, those that purchased the Season Pass have to purchase the Creation Club content if they wished to use it. During the suit's litigation in court, ZeniMax and Microsoft had announced plans for ZeniMax to be acquired into Xbox Game Studios which was anticipated to close by June 2021. The plaintiffs in the case sought a preliminary injunction to block the acquisition as to prevent Microsoft from shielding ZeniMax's assets should they be found liable in the case, which is expected to be heard in 2023.

Notes

References

External links 
 
 
 

2015 video games
Action role-playing video games
AIAS Game of the Year winners
Airships in fiction
Android (robot) video games
Bethesda Game Studios games
British Academy Games Award for Best Game winners
Cryonics in fiction
Fallout (series) video games
Fiction about fatherhood
Golden Joystick Award winners
HTC Vive games
LGBT-related video games
Open-world video games
PlayStation 4 games
PlayStation 4 Pro enhanced games
Retrofuturistic video games
Science fiction video games
Single-player video games
Valve Index games
Video game sequels
Video games about cannibalism
Video games about robots
Video games developed in the United States
Video games featuring protagonists of selectable gender
Video games scored by Inon Zur
Video games set in Boston
Video games set in Massachusetts
Video games set in the 23rd century
Video games set in the 2070s
Video games with alternate endings
Video games with customizable avatars
Video games with downloadable content
Video games with expansion packs
Windows games
Xbox Cloud Gaming games
Xbox One games
Xbox One X enhanced games
D.I.C.E. Award for Role-Playing Game of the Year winners